The Hefei–Jiujiang railway is a passenger and freight railway in China.

Between Jiujiang and Konglong, the line is double-track. The remainder is single-track. This double-track portion is shared with the Beijing–Kowloon railway. The Hefei–Anqing–Jiujiang high-speed railway takes a similar route to this railway.

History
The line opened on May 31, 1995.

Stations
The line has the following passenger stations:
Jiujiang
Xiaochikou (interchange with the Beijing–Kowloon railway)
Konglong (interchange with the Beijing–Kowloon railway)
Huangmei
Susong
Taihu
Tianzhushan
Anqing West
Tongcheng
Lujiang
Shucheng
Hefei

References

Railway lines in China
Railway lines opened in 1995